The 1982 Taça de Portugal Final was the final match of the 1981–82 Taça de Portugal, the 42nd season of the Taça de Portugal, the premier Portuguese football cup competition organized by the Portuguese Football Federation (FPF). The match was played on 29 May 1982 at the Estádio Nacional in Oeiras, and opposed two Primeira Liga sides: Braga and Sporting CP. Sporting CP defeated Braga 4–0 to claim the Taça de Portugal for an eleventh time.

In Portugal, the final was televised live on RTP. As a result of the Leões claiming both the league and cup double in the same season, cup runners-up Braga faced their cup final opponents in the 1982 Supertaça Cândido de Oliveira.

Match

Details

References

1982
Taca
S.C. Braga matches
Sporting CP matches